The Student Room Group (often referred to as TSR) is a UK-based privately held student community company. It owns four major student-facing websites: TheStudentRoom.co.uk, TheUniGuide.co.uk, GetRevising.co.uk and MarkedByTeachers.com and two commercial facing websites: tsrmatters.com and tsrinsight.com.

TheStudentRoom.co.uk

The Student Room (often abbreviated to TSR), established in 1999, is a United Kingdom based community and social learning website for school and university students.

It connects students with other students so that they can make more informed education choices, get help with their studies and get support with student life.

TheUniGuide.co.uk 
The Uni Guide provides advice on the university application process, as well as guides to UK universities and courses. These guides include statistics from a variety of sources including the Higher Education Statistics Agency (HESA), the National Student Survey (NSS) and Longitudinal Education Outcomes (LEO). The Uni Guide was formerly Which? University and was acquired by The Student Room Group in February 2020.

MarkedbyTeachers.com
www.markedbyteachers.com uses selected examples of real student work to help students learn. It has 150,000+ pieces of work written by UK students, of which many are also critiqued by UK teachers or peer-reviewed by students.

GetRevising.co.uk

www.getrevising.co.uk contains a broad range of supplementary social learning tools including flashcards, quizzes, word searches, mindmaps, crosswords, revision notes, quiz searches and revision cards. Students create their own resources which they can then share with peers.

Get Revising is also home to a study planner and revision timetable creator.

Staff & volunteers
The Student Room employs around 70 people, based both remotely and in its Brighton office.

The Student Room forum is also staffed by a team of volunteers and helpers who help manage the community output on the forums.

Forum structure of The Student Room 
The Student Room forum is divided into eight main sections.

 Study Help - where students can get help with homework and coursework
 University Courses - where students can get advice on university courses
 Universities - advice on specific universities
 Careers & Jobs - for discussions about volunteering, career sectors and job applications
 Life & Style - a general section that includes forums on health, relationships and fitness
 Entertainment - a general section that includes forums on sport, music and TV shows
 Debate & Current Affairs - for discussion of news and politics
 Chat - for general chat and anything that doesn't fit into the other sections 

Each of these sections has a number of forums and sub-forums.

History
The Student Room forum was created in around 2001 under its original name UK Learning. Launched by Charles Delingpole as a site where students at university could talk to each other, the forum has since developed into a site for all young people. The UK Learning name was changed to The Student Room in late 2004.

See also 
List of Internet forums

References

External links
TSRMatters.com Corporate  website 
The Student Room

Internet forums
Wiki communities
British educational websites
Youth model government